The VFF Tri Nation Series, also known as Hưng Thịnh International Football Tournament for sponsorship reason, and the eleventh edition of VFF Cup is a football tournament that have the Indian, Singaporean and host Vietnamese national teams as participants. It is being played from 21 September to 27 September 2022. The VFF organized the tournament by means of preparing their national team for the 2022 AFF Championship.

Participating nations
Three nations will participate in the tournament.

FIFA Rankings, as of 25 August 2022

Squads

India
The following 23 players were named in the final squad .
Caps and goals are correct as of 24 September 2022, after the match against .

Vietnam
The following players were called-up. Caps and goals as of 27 September 2022 after the match against .

Singapore
The following 23 players were selected.
Caps and goals updated as of 24 Sept 2022, after the match against .

Prize money

Standings
All times are National Standard Time – UTC+7

Matches

Statistics

Goal scorers
2 goals
  Nguyễn Văn Quyết

1 goal
  Ashique Kuruniyan
  Ikhsan Fandi
  Hồ Tấn Tài
  Khuất Văn Khang
  Nguyễn Thanh Nhân
  Nguyễn Văn Toàn
  Phan Văn Đức

Goal assists
1 assist
  Phan Văn Đức
  Sunil Chhetri
  Do Hung Dung

Clean sheets
1 clean sheet
  Đặng Văn Lâm
  Trần Nguyên Mạnh

References

VFF Cup
International association football competitions hosted by Vietnam
2022 in Asian football
 
2022 in Vietnamese football
2022 in Singaporean football
VFF